Leonardo Bertagnolli (born 8 January 1978 in Trento) is a retired Italian professional road bicycle racer, who rode as a professional between 2002 and 2012.

Bertagnolli announced his retirement from the sport after competing in the Italian National Championships in June 2012. It later emerged that the Union Cycliste Internationale had launched disciplinary proceedings into Bertagnolli, in the light of an alleged anti-doping violation via his biological passport, and he was given a sanction of 2 years and ten months as well as disqualified from 1 January 2003 to 18 May 2011.

Cancelled results

2004
 1st, Coppa Placci
 1st, Coppa Agostoni
 1st, Giro dell'Etna
2005
 1st, Stage 2, Vuelta a España
 1st, Stage 3, Tour du Limousin
2006
 1st, Stage 6, Tirreno–Adriatico
 1st, Tour du Haut-Var
2007
 1st, Clasica de San Sebastián
 1st, Memorial Cimurri
 4th, 2007 Deutschland Tour
2008
 1st, Intaka Tech Worlds View Challenge #2
2009
 1st, Stage 15, Giro d'Italia
 1st, Stage 2, Brixia Tour
2010
 1st, Stage 3, Tour of Austria
 2nd Overall Trofeo Matteotti
 3rd Coppa Sabatini

References

External links

Bertagnollis Witness statement 

1978 births
Living people
Italian male cyclists
Doping cases in cycling
Italian sportspeople in doping cases
Italian Vuelta a España stage winners
Sportspeople from Trento
Italian Giro d'Italia stage winners
Cyclists from Trentino-Alto Adige/Südtirol